The Group B of the 25th Arabian Gulf Cup is one of the two groups of competing nations in the 25th Arabian Gulf Cup. It consists of Bahrain, Kuwait, Qatar and United Arab Emirates. The matches will take place from 7 to 13 January 2023.

Teams

Standings

Matches

Bahrain vs United Arab Emirates

Kuwait vs Qatar

United Arab Emirates vs Kuwait

Qatar vs Bahrain

Bahrain vs Kuwait

United Arab Emirates vs Qatar

Discipline
Fair play points would have been used as tiebreakers if the overall and head-to-head records of teams were tied. These were calculated based on yellow and red cards received in all group matches as follows:
first yellow card: −1 point;
indirect red card (second yellow card): −3 points;
direct red card: −4 points;
yellow card and direct red card: −5 points;

Only one of the above deductions was applied to a player in a single match.

References 

Group B